Enzo is an Italian given name derivative of the German name Heinz. It can be used also as the short form for Lorenzo, Vincenzo, Innocenzo, or Fiorenzo. It is most common in the Romance-speaking world, particularly in Italy and Latin America but lately also in France and Spain.

People
 Enzo Amendola (born 1973), Italian politician
 Enzo Amore (born 1986), Ring name of American professional wrestler Eric Arndt
 Enzo Bearzot (1927-2010), Italian football player and manager
 Enzo Benedetto (1905–1993), Italian painter
 Enzo Biagi (1920–2007), Italian journalist
 Enzo Calzaghe (1949–2018), Anglo-Italian boxing trainer
 Enzo Cesario (born 1980), Chilean track and road cyclist
 Enzo Dara (1938–2017), Italian operatic bass
 Enzo Emanuele (born 1977), Italian medical researcher and editor
 Enzo Fernández (born 1995), French footballer
 Enzo Ferrari (1898–1988), Italian race car driver, founder of Scuderia Ferrari and Ferrari S.p.A.
 Enzo Ferrari (born 1942), Italian former footballer and manager
 Enzo Francescoli (born 1961), Uruguayan football player 
 Enzo Maccarinelli (born 1980), Welsh professional boxer 
 Enzo Maiorca (1931-2016), Italian multiple record holder in free-diving
 Enzo Maresca (born 1980), Italian football player 
 Enzo Mari (1932-2020), Italian artist and designer
 Enzo Muccetti (1912–1977), Italian classical bassoonist
 Enzo Pérez (born 1986), Argentine midfielder football player
 Enzo Roco (born 1992), Chilean football player
 Enzo Sacchi (1926–1988), Italian road bicycle and track cyclist
 Enzo Scifo (born 1966), Belgian football player 
 Enzo Sciotti (1944–2021), Italian artist and illustrator
 Enzo Sereni (1905-1944), Italian-Palestinian Zionist, writer, and SOE operative
 Enzo Stuarti (1919–2005), Italian-American singer

Fictional characters 
 Enzo, a side character from the video game series Bayonetta
 Enzo, Jerry's barber in the Seinfeld episode "The Barber"
 Uncle Enzo, a character in the novel Snow Crash
 Enzo Aguello, AKA Enzo the baker in The Godfather
 Enzo Kang, a character in To the Edge of the Sky
 Enzo Macleod, main character in book series The Enzo Files by Peter May
 Enzo Matrix, a character in the CGI television series ReBoot
 Enzo Scanno, a character in the Neapolitan Novels
 Enzo St. John, a character in the TV series The Vampire Diaries

See also 
 Enrico
 Enso (disambiguation)
 Enzo (dog actor), a star of the Frasier sitcom
 Enzo Ferrari (automobile), a sports car formerly produced by Ferrari, named after its founder
 Ozone Enzo, a competition level paraglider

Italian masculine given names
Spanish masculine given names